Lyon Zoo (fr. Zoo de Lyon, also known as Jardin zoologique de Lyon, or Zoo du Parc de la Tête d'Or) is a zoo in France located in Auvergne-Rhône-Alpes inside parc de la Tête d'Or in the town of Lyon.

The zoo was founded 1858 by Claude-Marius Vaïsse (8 July 1799 – 8 August 1864), a French lawyer who joined the administration of the July Monarchy.

The zoo presents 300 animals from 66 Species

Lyon Zoo is member of EAZA.

References

See also 
 Parc de la Tête d'Or

Zoos in France
Zoos established in 1858
Buildings and structures in Lyon
Tourist attractions in Lyon
Organizations based in Lyon